Jacqueline Jill Smith (born 3 November 1962) is a British broadcaster, political commentator and former Labour Party politician. She was Member of Parliament (MP) for Redditch from 1997 to 2010. She served as Home Secretary from 2007 to 2009 and was the first woman to hold the position.

Smith was born and raised in Malvern, Worcestershire. She attended Hertford College, Oxford, before training to become a teacher at Worcester College of Higher Education and having a career as an economics and business studies teacher. She was elected for Redditch at the 1997 general election. She joined the government in 1999 and served in a series of ministerial positions under Prime Minister Tony Blair. In the 2006 cabinet reshuffle she was promoted to Chief Whip.

Following Gordon Brown's appointment as Prime Minister, Smith became the first female Home Secretary. She resigned as Home Secretary in June 2009 following her involvement in the United Kingdom parliamentary expenses scandal in which she had falsely claimed that a room in her sister's house was her main home. Smith, one of the highest profile figures involved in the scandal, then lost her seat as MP for Redditch in the 2010 general election. After leaving the House of Commons, she remained in public life as a political pundit and took up roles in various other sectors, such as health and media.

Early life and career
Smith was born in Malvern, Worcestershire. She attended Dyson Perrins High School in Malvern. Her parents were teachers, and both Labour councillors, although her mother briefly joined the Social Democratic Party. Her local MP, Conservative backbencher Michael Spicer, recalled in Parliament in 2003 how he had first met her when he addressed the sixth form at The Chase School, where her mother was a teacher; he joked: "So great was my eloquence that she immediately rushed off and joined the Labour Party." Smith obtained a place to study philosophy, politics and economics at Hertford College, Oxford.

After graduating, she moved to London and worked as a researcher for Labour MP Terry Davis.

Deciding she wanted a career outside politics, Smith moved out of London and gained a Postgraduate Certificate in Education from Worcester College of Higher Education. Working as a school teacher, she taught economics at Arrow Vale High School in Redditch from 1986 to 1988 and at Worcester Sixth Form College, before becoming head of economics and General National Vocational Qualification co-ordinator at Haybridge High School, Hagley in 1990. During this time Smith held positions in the local Labour party and campaigned on behalf of the party.

Smith worked as secretary of the National Organisation of Labour Students and describes herself as having a "feminist background". She served on Redditch Borough Council from 1991 to 1996, where she chaired the development committee. Smith was unsuccessful in an attempt to be elected as (Labour) MP for the safe Conservative seat of Mid Worcestershire in the 1992 general election, despite achieving a 4.9% swing. In early 1997 she was identified by The Independent as a potential future cabinet member.

Political career

Member of Parliament
Smith was selected through an all-women shortlist as the Labour candidate for Redditch, a new constituency created after a boundary review. She won the seat in the 1997 general election, as part of a (then) record number of female MPs elected to the House of Commons. 

Smith entered the Government in July 1999, as a Parliamentary Under-Secretary of State at the Department for Education and Employment, working with the Minister for School Standards Estelle Morris. She then became a Minister of State at the Department of Health after the 2001 general election. She was appointed as deputy Minister for Women in 2003, working alongside Secretary of State Patricia Hewitt. In this role she published the government's proposals for same-sex civil partnerships, a system designed to offer same-sex couples an opportunity to gain legal recognition for their relationships with an associated set of rights and responsibilities.

In the 2005 general election Smith had a majority of just 2,716 (6.7% of the vote), owing to boundary changes.

Minister for Schools
Following the 2005 general election, Smith was appointed Minister of State for Schools at the Department for Education and Skills, replacing Stephen Twigg who had lost his seat. Teacher trade union sources stated that Smith "talked to us on our level".

Chief Whip
In the 2006 cabinet reshuffle Smith was appointed as the government's Chief Whip. In a period when supporters of Gordon Brown were pushing Prime Minister Tony Blair to resign, she was successfully able to calm the situation down. The BBC's political editor Nick Robinson described her as being effective at "making peace between the warring Blair and Brown factions".

Smith was regarded as a loyal Blairite during Tony Blair's premiership, a position reflected in her voting record, and she was brought to tears by Blair's farewell appearance in the House of Commons.

Home Secretary
In Gordon Brown's first cabinet reshuffle on 28 June 2007, Smith expressed interest in becoming Secretary of State for Education, but was appointed Home Secretary. She became the first woman to hold the position and the third woman to hold one of the Great Offices of State, after Margaret Thatcher (Prime Minister) and Margaret Beckett (Foreign Secretary). Just one day into her new job bombs were found in London, and a terrorist attack took place in Glasgow the following day.

On 24 January 2008, she announced new powers for the police, including the proposal to permit law enforcement services to hold terrorist suspects or those linked to terrorism for up to 42 days without charging them. In the same month Smith said that she would not feel safe on the streets of London at night. Critics suggested her statements were an admission that the government had failed to tackle crime effectively. Smith also introduced legislation to toughen the prostitution laws of England and Wales, making it a criminal offence to pay for sex with a prostitute controlled by a pimp, with the possibility that anyone caught paying for sex with an illegally trafficked woman could face criminal charges.

Smith introduced a crime mapping scheme to allow citizens of England and Wales to access local crime information and how to combat crime. As Home Secretary, she was able to announce that minor crime dropped year-on-year under the Labour government, and continued to do so in 2008.

Smith managed to pass the 42-day detention law plans in the House of Commons, despite heavy opposition. The House of Lords voted overwhelmingly against the law, with some of the Lords reportedly characterising it as "fatally flawed, ill-thought-through and unnecessary", stating that "it seeks to further erode fundamental legal and civil rights". In March 2009, Smith published the first ever public Counter Terror Strategy.

When Conservative MP Damian Green was arrested in his Commons office, Smith stated that she was not informed of the impending arrest. The Metropolitan Police said that Green was "arrested on suspicion of conspiring to commit misconduct in a public office and aiding and abetting, counselling or procuring misconduct in a public office". A junior Home Office official, Christopher Galley, was later arrested regarding the same alleged offences as Green, and was released on bail. He was not charged, but he was suspended from his Home Office job while the investigation continued. He was later dismissed from his position for gross misconduct. Green did not dispute having dealings with the Home Office official.

In March 2009, at the height of the expenses furore, a leaked poll of Labour Party members revealed that Smith was considered to be the worst performing member of the Cabinet, with only 56% of her party believing she was doing a good job.

In October 2018 Chief Prosecutor in North West England, Nazir Afzal, alleged on BBC Radio 4 that the Home Office had issued a memo to all police forces in 2008, informing that the child victims of Pakistani grooming gangs had made an "informed choice" and "it's not for you police officers to get involved in". Smith ran the Home Office at the time of this alleged instruction.

National identity legislation 

In May 2009, Smith announced that the cost of introducing the National Identity Card project (a scheme abandoned by the incoming Liberal-Conservative coalition government in May 2010), had risen to an estimated £5.3 billion, and that it would first become compulsory for foreign students and airport staff. It was planned that the cards would be made available from high-street shops at an estimated cost of £60. Smith defended her decision to use high-street shops, and stated that the hope was to make enrolment in the scheme a less intimidating experience and to make the cards easier to access. She claimed, despite evidence to the contrary, that the majority of the population was in favour of the scheme. In another privacy-related issue, Smith said she was disappointed at the European Court of Human Rights' decision to strike down a law allowing the government to store the DNA and fingerprints of people with no criminal record; in December 2008 an estimated 850,000 such DNA samples were being held in England and Wales. Her compromise was to scale down the length of time that data could be kept, with a maximum limit of 12 years. This went against the spirit of the Court's decision.

Drug policy 
On 19 July 2007, Smith admitted to smoking cannabis a few times in Oxford in the 1980s. "I did break the law... I was wrong... drugs are wrong", she said. Asked why students today should listen when she urged them not to try the drug, she said that the dangers of cannabis use had become clearer, including mental health issues and the increasing strength of the drug over the past 25 years. Smith's admission was made public the day after Gordon Brown appointed her head of a new government review of UK drugs strategy.

In May 2008, against the recommendations of her own scientific advisers, Smith reversed the government's 2004 decision to downgrade cannabis to a class C drug, returning it to the status of class B, with the law change taking effect on 26 January 2009. According to her most senior expert drugs adviser Professor David Nutt, the following exchange took place between Smith and himself:

In February 2009, Smith was accused by Nutt of making a political decision in rejecting the scientific advice to downgrade ecstasy from a class A drug. The advisory council on the misuse of drugs (ACMD) report on ecstasy, based on a 12-month study of 4,000 academic papers, concluded that it is nowhere near as dangerous as other class A drugs such as heroin and crack cocaine, and should be downgraded to class B alongside amphetamines and cannabis. The advice was not followed; the government saying that it was "not prepared to send a message to young people that we take ecstasy less seriously". Smith was also widely criticised by the scientific community for bullying Professor Nutt into apologising for his factual comments that, in the course of a normal year, more people died from falling off horses than died from taking ecstasy.

Exclusion list
On 5 May 2009, Smith named 16 "undesirable individuals", including convicted murderers and advocates of violence, who were to be banned from entering the United Kingdom over their alleged threat to public order. Controversially, the exclusion list included outspoken American talk radio host Michael Savage, who instructed London lawyers to sue Smith for "serious and damaging defamatory allegations".

A Home Office spokeswoman said: "The home secretary has made it clear that if such a case was brought that any legal proceedings would be robustly defended."
Smith defended the choice of individuals by declaring, "If you can't live by the rules that we live by, the standards and the values that we live by, we should exclude you from this country and, what's more, now we will make public those people that we have excluded." The Guardian criticised Smith's actions.

Expenses controversies and resignation

Smith was investigated by the Parliamentary Commissioner for Standards over accusations that she had inappropriately designated her sister's home in London as her main residence. The arrangement had allowed Smith to claim over £116,000 on her family's Redditch home since becoming an MP. Smith said that she had followed advice from parliamentary authorities.

On 8 February 2009, it was reported in the media that Smith had designated a house in London owned by her sister as her main residence in order to claim a parliamentary allowance for her house in Redditch as a secondary home, despite explicitly stating on her website that she "lives in Redditch". When asked whether it was fair that she made claims believed to have been made for items such as a flat-screen TV and scatter cushions, she said that analyses of her receipts had been very particular. In response to criticisms over her housing allowances, she said it was the "nature of the job" that MPs had to furnish and run two properties.

It was also reported that Smith had claimed expenses for a telecoms bill that contained two pornographic films and two other pay-per-view films. Smith said it was a mistake, and she would repay the amount. The reports made clear that the films had been viewed in the family home at a time when Smith was not present, and that she had given her husband, Richard Timney, a "real ear-bashing" over the incident. This and other cases prompted calls for reform of the additional costs allowance and a new system of payments to be introduced. Gordon Brown supported her and said she had done nothing wrong. However, Sir Alistair Graham, the former chairman of the Committee on Standards in Public Life, was critical of her actions, stating that naming her sister's spare bedroom as her main home was "near fraudulent". Smith was one of the highest profile politicians involved in the expenses scandal and citing the impact on her family life she later resigned.

In October 2009, it was reported that the Standards Commissioner, John Lyon, had looked into complaints over her expense claims. He concluded that, although her London home was a genuine home and she had spent more nights there than in her Redditch home, her constituency home was in fact her main home, and that she was in breach of Commons rules, despite "significant mitigating circumstances". The claims for pay-per-view films were also found to be in breach. Ms Smith was not asked to repay any money, but was told to "apologise to the House by means of a personal statement." Smith reacted by saying that she was "disappointed that this process has not led to a fairer set of conclusions, based on objective and consistent application of the rules as they were at the time."

In an interview with Radio Times published in February 2011, Smith claimed that her expenses had been scrutinised because she was a woman, saying: "[I] know that it was my expenses people looked at first because I was a woman and should have been at home looking after my husband and children." Smith said that she had felt "frozen rather than angry" on learning that her husband had entered a parliamentary expenses claim for two pornographic films.

On 2 June 2009, Smith confirmed that she would leave the Cabinet in the next reshuffle, expected after the local and European elections. She left office on 5 June and returned to the backbenches. She was replaced by Alan Johnson. In a subsequent interview with Total Politics magazine regarding her time as Home Secretary, Smith described how she felt under-qualified for her ministerial roles, adding "when I became Home Secretary, I'd never run a major organisation. I hope I did a good job. But if I did, it was more by luck than by any kind of development of skills. I think we should have been better trained. I think there should have been more induction." Smith's major achievements as Home Secretary were introduction of tougher prostitution laws, a reduction in crime rates and promotion of Police Community Support Officers. Journalist Andrew Pierce echoed Smith's comments about her unsuitability for the position of home secretary, going further by stating: "Smith, beset by gaffes and errors, was hopelessly out of her depth in one of the most demanding jobs in politics".

Leaving Parliament
In the general election on 6 May 2010, Smith lost her seat as MP for Redditch to Karen Lumley of the Conservative Party, who won the seat with a majority of 5,821 votes. Smith said that she had been "immensely honoured" to serve Redditch. Smith wrote an open letter to the new Conservative home secretary Theresa May, advising her that the post was often seen as a "poisoned chalice".

After politics
In 2010, she began working as a consultant for KPMG and as an adviser to Sarina Russo Job Access. She applied to be vice-chairman of the BBC Trust. Smith presented a documentary on pornography, for BBC Radio 5 Live, called Porn Again which was broadcast on 3 March 2011. It was followed by a special edition of the Tony Livesey show, discussing pornography.
She has regularly been on This Week and Question Time and was also a regular weekly commentator on Sky News' Press Preview. She also contributed to The Purple Book in 2011, putting forward new ideas on crime and policing.

On 24 August 2011 it emerged that Smith had arranged for two prisoners on day-release to paint a room in her house, when they were supposed to be undertaking work to benefit the community. The Ministry of Justice launched an internal investigation into the matter, and Smith made a donation to the charity overseeing the scheme. The episode was condemned by Matthew Elliot of the TaxPayers' Alliance, who stated: "It's a disgrace that a former home secretary has used prisoners as her personal handymen".

Smith previously co-hosted a weekly show on talk radio station LBC alongside former Conservative cabinet minister David Mellor – she took over from Ken Livingstone after he left to contest the London mayoral race of 2012. She became chair of University Hospitals Birmingham NHS Foundation Trust in December 2013, though in 2020 she stepped down from this role temporarily to perform in Strictly Come Dancing.

Smith publicly supported the campaign for the UK to remain in the European Union in the 2016 EU referendum, and continued to argue for a second referendum on the issue until the 2019 general election.

Since 2017, Smith has co-hosted a weekly political and current affairs podcast, entitled For The Many, alongside LBC broadcaster Iain Dale. She has appeared on Good Morning Britain on ITV. She is also the chair of both the Jo Cox Foundation and the Sandwell Children's Trust.

In September 2020, it was announced that Smith would compete in the eighteenth series of Strictly Come Dancing. She was partnered with Anton Du Beke, and became the first celebrity to be voted off the show.

In 2021 she was appointed as chair of both Barts Health NHS Trust and Barking, Havering and Redbridge University Hospitals NHS Trust.

Personal life

Smith married Richard Timney in October 1987 and they have two sons. Smith employed her husband as her parliamentary aide on a salary of £40,000. In January 2020, she and Timney announced they had ended their marriage.

Honours
 2003: Appointed to the Privy Council of the United Kingdom, giving her the honorific title "The Right Honourable" for life.
 2013: She was recognized as one of the BBC's 100 women.

References

Further reading

External links
 
 Guardian Unlimited Politics – Ask Aristotle: Jacqui Smith MP
 TheyWorkForYou.com – Jacqui Smith MP
 BBC News – Find Your MP: Jacqui Smith 
 Open Directory Project — Jacqui Smith directory category
 The Register Jacqui Smith on Technology

|-

|-

|-

|-

|-

|-

|-

|-

|-

1962 births
Living people
Alumni of Hertford College, Oxford
Alumni of the University of Worcester
Female members of the Parliament of the United Kingdom for English constituencies
Female members of the Cabinet of the United Kingdom
Labour Party (UK) MPs for English constituencies
Members of the Privy Council of the United Kingdom
People from Malvern, Worcestershire
People from Redditch (district)
Secretaries of State for the Home Department
UK MPs 1997–2001
UK MPs 2001–2005
UK MPs 2005–2010
BBC 100 Women
20th-century British women politicians
21st-century British women politicians
Female interior ministers
English feminists
20th-century English women
20th-century English people
21st-century English women
21st-century English people